Tak Meydan (also Romanized as Tak Meydān; also known as Tak Meydūn) is a village in Kakhk Rural District, Kakhk District, Gonabad County, Razavi Khorasan Province, Iran. At the 2006 census, its population was 24, in 9 families.

References 

Populated places in Gonabad County